Wellington de Jorge Estanislau Paeckart, better known as Pecka (born May 2, 1989), is a Brazilian footballer who currently plays as a defensive midfielder for North Carolina FC in USL League One.

Career
Wellington Jorge Paeckart Stanislaus is a defensive midfielder who started his career at Flamengo, training in the first team in 2009, under the orders of the coach Andrade, and in 2010 after training with the first team, was loaned to CFZ in 2010, which is the club founded by Flamengo's greatest idol, Zico, however, later in the year Pecka returned to Flamengo.

On 22 August 2011 Pecka signed with the Fort Lauderdale Strikers. He scored his first goal for the club on 8 September 2012 in a 1-1 draw with the Puerto Rico Islanders. On 22 January 2014 Fort Lauderdale announced they had picked up the contract of Pecka and sent him on a three-month loan to Madureira Esporte Clube.

Pecka was signed by Major League Soccer club Real Salt Lake on January 16, 2015. He was released following the 2015 season.

On January 15, 2016, Pecka was announced as one of the first three signings by NASL expansion side Rayo OKC.

Pecka signed with San Antonio FC on January 18, 2017 after Rayo OKC ceased operations in the NASL.

After three seasons in San Antonio, Pecka joined North Carolina FC of the USL Championship.

Career statistics

Club
Statistics accurate as of 14 June 2013

References

External links
 Player profile @ Flapédia
 ogol
 strikers.com

1989 births
Living people
Brazilian footballers
Brazilian expatriate footballers
Brazilian expatriate sportspeople in the United States
CR Flamengo footballers
Fort Lauderdale Strikers players
Real Salt Lake players
Real Monarchs players
Expatriate soccer players in the United States
North American Soccer League players
USL Championship players
Major League Soccer players
Rayo OKC players
Association football midfielders
North Carolina FC players
Footballers from Rio de Janeiro (city)